"Hold on Tight" is an electronic single by Dutch–Moroccan DJ/remixer/musician R3hab and English singer Conor Maynard, who also co-wrote the song. The track became the third number one single in the United States for R3hab and Maynard's first on Billboard's Dance Club Songs chart, reaching the summit in its August 11, 2018 issue.

Track listing

Charts

Weekly charts

Year-end charts

References

External links
Official Video at YouTube

 

 

2018 songs
2018 singles
R3hab songs
Conor Maynard songs